Adam Bennett (born March 30, 1971) is a Canadian former professional ice hockey defenceman and coach.  He was selected in the first round of the 1989 NHL Entry Draft, 6th overall, by the Chicago Blackhawks.

Playing career
Bennett played junior with the Sudbury Wolves of the OHL.  In his first season, he was drafted by the Blackhawks, but he played two more years in junior, culminating in an all-star selection at the end of the 1990–91 season.  He turned professional immediately after the junior season ended, fitting in three games with the Indianapolis Ice of the IHL.
Bennett spent the next two seasons splitting time in the IHL and the NHL, before finally being dealt to the Edmonton Oilers at the start of the 1993–94 NHL season.  He played a career high 48 games for the Oilers, in what would be his last NHL season.  He played just two more years of professional hockey, with the Cape Breton Oilers of the AHL and the Richmond Renegades of the ECHL.

Post-playing career 
Bennett joined the Mississauga Ice Dogs of the OHL as an assistant coach for the 1998–99 season.  Adam is currently the GM and Head Coach at Clearwater Prep Hockey Academy in Clearwater, Florida.

Awards 
1991 - OHL Second All-Star Team

Career statistics

Transactions 
October 7, 1993 - Chicago trades Bennett to Edmonton for Kevin Todd

External links 

Clearwater Prep Hockey Academy

1971 births
Living people
Canadian ice hockey defencemen
Cape Breton Oilers players
Chicago Blackhawks draft picks
Chicago Blackhawks players
Edmonton Oilers players
Ice hockey people from Ontario
Indianapolis Ice players
National Hockey League first-round draft picks
People from Halton Hills
Richmond Renegades players
Sudbury Wolves players